Waterford Township is one of the twenty-two townships of Washington County, Ohio, United States.  The 2000 census found 3,708 people in the township, 2,426 of whom lived in the unincorporated portions of the township.

Geography
Located in the northwestern corner of the county, it borders the following townships:
Center Township, Morgan County - north
Jackson Township, Noble County - northeast corner
Adams Township - east
Watertown Township - south
Windsor Township, Morgan County - west

The village of Beverly is located in central Beverly Township, and the unincorporated communities of Coal Run and Waterford lie in the township's northeast and south.

Name and history
It is the only Waterford Township statewide.

Government
The township is governed by a three-member board of trustees, who are elected in November of odd-numbered years to a four-year term beginning on the following January 1. Two are elected in the year after the presidential election and one is elected in the year before it. There is also an elected township fiscal officer, who serves a four-year term beginning on April 1 of the year after the election, which is held in November of the year before the presidential election. Vacancies in the fiscal officership or on the board of trustees are filled by the remaining trustees.

References

External links
County website

Townships in Washington County, Ohio
Townships in Ohio